Translatix is a genus of moths of the family Noctuidae. The genus was erected by Emilio Berio in 1991. The type species of the genus is Hypenodes kalchbergi Staudinger, 1876.

References

Catocalinae